is a Japanese actress and narrator. The daughter of a painter, she was born in Komagome, Hongō (present-day Bunkyo), in the city of Tokyo, Japan. She graduated from Joshibi University of Art and Design.

Naraoka debuted as a cinema actress in the 1949 film Chijin no Ai, based on the novel Naomi. In 1981 she appeared in Rengō Kantai (lit. "Combined Fleet", United States title: The Imperial Navy). She also appeared in Tora-san's Salad-Day Memorial (a 1988 movie in the long-running Otoko wa Tsurai yo series) as well as eight films in the Tsuribaka Nisshi series.  Naraoka has appeared in several NHK Taiga dramas. Her first was the 1969 Ten to Chi to, in the role of the wife of Uesugi Sadazane. She portrayed Kita no Mandokoro (the wife of Toyotomi Hideyoshi) in Haru no Sakamichi (1971). Her next Taiga drama appearance was in 1976 in Kaze to Kumo to Niji to. She narrated the 1986 Inochi and 1989 Kasuga no Tsubone. She is the narrator of the 2008 drama Atsuhime.  Other noteworthy narration roles include the 1983 serialized morning television drama Oshin. She also narrated Onna wa Dokyō (1992) and Haru Yo Koi (1994–1995). A nonfiction voice role was in the series Kiwameru: Nihon no Bi to Kokoro.

Filmography

Film
(Partial list)
 Chijin no Ai (1949)
 Wolf (1955)
 Night Drum (1958)
 Ballad of the Cart (1959)
 The Scent of Incense (1964)
 Ballad of Orin (1977)
 The Imperial Navy (1981)
 Tora-san's Salad-Day Memorial (1988)
 Ruten no umi (1990)
 My Sons (1991)
 Poppoya (1999) – Mune Katō
 Ponyo on the Cliff by the Sea (2008) – Yoshie (voice)
 Railways (2010) – Kinyo
 Takatsu-gawa (2022) – Kinue Saitō
 The Zen Diary (2022) – Chie

Television
 Ten to Chi to (1969)
 Haru no Sakamichi (1971) – Kōdai-in
 Oshin (1983–84) – Narrator
 Inochi (1986) – Narrator
 Taiyō ni Hoero! Part 2 (1986) – Asako Takamura
 Kasuga no Tsubone (1989) – Narrator
 Onna wa Dokyō (1992) – Narrator
 Haru yo, koi (1994–95) – Narrator
 Atsuhime (2008) – Narrator
 Gō (2011) – Ōmandokoro
 Nankyoku Tairiku (2011) – Narrator

Theater
 Driving Miss Daisy (2005) – Daisy Werthan

Honours
Medal with Purple Ribbon (1992)
Order of the Rising Sun, 4th Class, Gold Rays with Rosette (2000)

References

　This article incorporates material from 奈良岡朋子 in the Japanese Wikipedia, retrieved September 22, 2007.

External links

Tomoko Naraoka at JMDB 

1929 births
Actresses from Tokyo
Japanese film actresses
Japanese stage actresses
Japanese television actresses
Living people
Recipients of the Medal with Purple Ribbon
Recipients of the Order of the Rising Sun, 4th class
20th-century Japanese actresses
21st-century Japanese actresses